Antimora is a genus of morid cods.

Species
The currently recognized species in this genus are:
 Antimora microlepis T. H. Bean, 1890 (finescale mora)
 Antimora rostrata (Günther, 1878) (blue antimora)

References

Moridae
Taxa named by Albert Günther